Psidium raimondii is a species of plant in the family Myrtaceae. It is native to Peru.

References

raimondii
Flora of Peru
Taxa named by Max Burret